John Paterson (born 14 December 1897 – 11 January 1973) was a Scottish footballer who played as a forward.

Career
Born in Dundee, Paterson played club football for Dundee, Leicester City, Sunderland, Preston North End, Queens Park Rangers, Mid Rhondda and Mansfield Town, and made one appearance for Scotland in 1920. For Sunderland he scored 40 goals in 77 appearances in all competitions. Prior to his football career Paterson had been injured while serving with the Black Watch in World War I.

References

1897 births
1973 deaths
Scottish footballers
Scotland international footballers
Dundee F.C. players
Dundee North End F.C. players
Leicester City F.C. players
Sunderland A.F.C. players
Queens Park Rangers F.C. players
Preston North End F.C. players
Mid Rhondda F.C. players
Mansfield Town F.C. players
Association football forwards
Scottish Junior Football Association players
Scottish Football League players
English Football League players
Footballers from Dundee
Black Watch soldiers
British Army personnel of World War I